The Bullion Stone is a late carved Pictish stone, which is unusual in containing a figure; it dates to c. 900–950. It was discovered in 1933 at Bullion field, Invergowrie, during the construction of a road and is now located in the Museum of Scotland in Edinburgh. The image on the stone is unique amongst Pictish stones discovered thus far. It depicts a bald, bearded man on a weary horse, carrying a shield and drinking from a very large drinking horn with a bird's head terminal, a parallel that has been noted to the Torrs Horns, also in the museum, of nearly 1,000 years earlier.

See also
 Pictish stones
 Stones of Scotland

References

Pictish stones
Collections of the National Museums of Scotland
10th-century sculptures
10th century in Scotland
Drinking horns